

National flag

President flags

Military flags

Provincial flags

Political flags

Ethnic group flags

Historical flags

Proposed flags

Burgees

See also 

 Flag of Angola
 Coat of arms of Angola

References 

Lists and galleries of flags
Flags